William "Bill" Marler (born ) is an American personal injury lawyer and food safety advocate.  He is the managing partner of Marler Clark, a law firm based in Seattle, Washington which specializes in foodborne illness cases.

Background

In 1993, Marler represented 9-year-old Brianne Kiner in litigation against Jack in the Box following an E. coli O157:H7 outbreak, securing a $15.6 million settlement. He subsequently directed his practice toward foodborne illness, representing many more people affected by diseases such as E. coli, hepatitis A, and Salmonellosis. He has been involved in litigation relating to most of the large foodborne illness outbreaks in the United States, representing individuals against large companies such as Chili's, Kentucky Fried Chicken, Dole, and ConAgra.

Marler is also involved with OutBreak, a nonprofit organization under the auspices of Marler Clark. In this capacity he travels extensively, discussing foodborne illness litigation and related issues with public health groups, fair associations, and food industry groups. 

As a proponent of improved food regulation, Marler has been asked to speak to numerous groups to address the subject, including testimony to both the California State Senate Governmental Organization Committee and the U.S. House Committee on Energy and Commerce.

Marler's involvement in the 1993 Jack in the Box E. coli outbreak is detailed in author Jeff Benedict's book Poisoned: The True Story of the Deadly E. Coli Outbreak That Changed the Way Americans Eat. 

In 2009, Marler founded Food Safety News to "fill a void" in food safety's media coverage. He is a regular contributor to the Food Poison Journal. In January 2016, The Daily Meal named him one of "America's 50 Most Powerful People in Food for 2016". His professional blog was listed by the American Bar Association as one of the top 100 legal blogs. And in The New Yorker piece "A Bug in the System", journalist Wil S. Hylton referred to Marler as "the most prominent and powerful food-safety attorney in the country." According to Marler's own estimation he has won over $600 million in food safety judgements for his clients.

A January 19, 2020 article in The Washington Post detailed Marler's fight for USDA regulations that would ban meat contaminated with certain Salmonella strains from being sold.

Awards and distinctions
Seattle University Distinguished Law Graduate Award (2013)
Seattle University Professional Achievement Award (2011)
NSF Food Safety Leadership Award: Innovation in Education (2010)
 Public Justice Award, Washington State Trial Lawyer's Association (2008)
 Outstanding Lawyer Award, Seattle/King County Bar Association (2008)
 "Super Lawyer", Washington State Attorneys (1998–Present) 
 Governor Appointee, Washington State University Board of Regents (1998-2004)
 Distinguished Achievement Award, WSU College of Liberal Arts (1997)

Bibliography

Selected publications

References

External links

Living people
Washington (state) lawyers
Washington State University alumni
Seattle University School of Law alumni
1957 births